Samir Aboud  (born 29 September 1972) is a retired Libyan footballer who played for Al-Ittihad as a goalkeeper. He was a member of the Libya national team.

Honours
 He has won the most Libyan Football Competitions (25 titles).
 Libyan Premier League 9
  Al-Ittihad 1991, 2002, 2003,  2005, 2006, 2007, 2008, 2009, 2010
Libyan Cup 6
  Al-Ittihad 1992, 1999, 2004,  2005, 2007, 2009
Libyan Super Cup 10
  Al-Ittihad 1999, 2002, 2003, 2004, 2005, 2006, 2007, 2008, 2009, 2010
2012 African Goalkeeper of the year.

 Abbud is the only Libyan football player who had played two semi-finals in African Club Competitions.
 1st Semi-Final was in African Cup Winners' Cup 2000 with Al-Ittihad
 2nd Semi-Final was in CAF Champions League 2007 with Al-Ittihad
 He has scored four Goals in his football Career
 1st goal was in the LPL in 2005 against  Al Shat from the penalty spot.
 2nd goal was in the ACL in 2005 against  Al Wydad Casablanca from the penalty spot.
 3rd goal was in the LPL in 2009 against  Attahaddy Benghazi S.C. from the penalty spot.
 4th goal was in the LPL in 2009 against  Al-Nasr SCSC (Benghazi) from the penalty spot.
CAF Team of the Year: 2011

References

External links

Player profile - MTN Africa Cup of Nations 2006

1976 births
Living people
People from Tripoli, Libya
Libyan footballers
Libya international footballers
Association football goalkeepers
Al-Ittihad Club (Tripoli) players
2006 Africa Cup of Nations players
2012 Africa Cup of Nations players
Libyan Premier League players